Social utility efficiency (SUE) is a measurement of the utilitarian performance of voting methods—how likely they are to elect the candidate who best represents the voters' preferences.

It is also known as utilitarian efficiency, voter satisfaction index (VSI) or voter satisfaction efficiency (VSE).

Definition 
Social utility efficiency is defined as the ratio between the social utility of the candidate who is actually elected by a given voting method and that of the candidate who would maximize social utility, where is the expected value over many iterations of the sum of all voter utilities for a given candidate:

A voting method with 100% efficiency would always pick the candidate that maximizes voter utility.  A method that chooses a winner randomly would have efficiency of 0%, and a (pathological) method that did worse than a random pick would have less than 0% efficiency.

SUE is not only affected by the voting method, but is a function of the number of voters, number of candidates, and of any strategies used by the voters.

History 
The concept was originally introduced as a system's "effectiveness" by Robert J. Weber in 1977, defined as:

He used a random society (impartial culture) model to analytically calculate the effectiveness of FPTP, two Approval variants, and Borda, as the number of voters approaches infinity.

It was given the name "social utility efficiency" and extended to the more realistic spatial model of voting by Samuel Merrill III in the 1980s, calculated statistically from random samples, with 25–201 voters and 2–10 candidates. This analysis included FPTP, Runoff, IRV, Coombs, Approval, Black, and Borda (in increasing order of efficiency).  (Merrill's model normalizes individual voter utility before finding the utility winner, while Weber's does not, so that Merrill considers all 2-candidate voting systems to have an SUE of 100%, decreasing with more candidates, while Weber considers them to have an effectiveness of  = 81.6%, with some systems increasing with more candidates.)

In 2017, Jameson Quinn studied SUE under the name "voter satisfaction efficiency", using more complex and arguably more realistic parameters, examining a wider variety of scenarios and using a hierarchical cluster model of voter behavior.  He analyzed a number of methods that had not been included in previous simulations, and his unpublished results found the best performers to be STAR voting, his own method 3-2-1 voting, Ranked pairs, or Score voting, depending on the scenario tested.

A similar metric, referred to as "Bayesian regret", measures the same property, but inverted and non-normalized. They are related by the formula:

where "random winner" refers to the hypothetical election method of choosing a candidate at random regardless of the opinions of the electorate (not the random ballot voting method, which is weighted towards candidates who receive more votes).

See also 

 Condorcet efficiency
Comparison of electoral systems

References 

Voting theory
Electoral systems